Hari Krishna Karki is a Nepalese judge. He is currently serving as the acting chief justice of the Supreme Court of Nepal since 13 December 2022 succeeding Cholendra Shumsher JB Rana.

See also
 Deepak Raj Joshee
 Gopal Prasad Parajuli

References

External links
 Supreme Court of Nepal

Living people
Justices of the Supreme Court of Nepal
1958 births
Nepalese Hindus
People from Okhaldhunga District